The Battle of Mailberg took place on 12 May 1082. The opponents were Vratislaus II of Bohemia and Leopold II, Margrave of Austria.

Battle
Vratislaus invaded Austria with an army of 6,000 soldiers from Bohemia and another 2,000 mercenaries from Moravia and Bavaria. Leopold and his army of about 3,500 soldiers met the invaders in a valley near Mailberg. Leopold was probably supported by additional forces from the conquered areas who remained loyal to the Babenbergs.

According to reports by the historian Cosmas of Prague, Leopold arranged his troops in a wedge configuration, while Wratislaw arranged his troops in three parallel columns: the Moravian troops on the left, the Bohemian troops in the center, and the heavily armed Bavarians on the right.

Aftermath
Vratislav and his allies achieved a complete victory. The losses on the Bohemian side were minor, according to Cosmas. The Austrians were taken prisoner and held for ransom. Only a few of Leopold's men were able to escape. In 1899, at a construction site near Mailberg, the remains of numerous soldiers and horses were discovered—most likely from the Battle of Mailberg.

As a result of the battle, the northern areas of Lower Austria were devastated from pillage and famine. The Bohemian border was moved closer to Mailberg, recapturing land that had been lost to the Austrians under Bretislaus I in 1041. After the death of Leopold II in 1095, his daughter Gerbirg (Gerberga) married Bořivoj II, the second son Vratislav in 1100.

References

External links
 Mailberg at AEIOU

1082 in Europe
Mailberg
Mailberg
Mailberg